My Dear is a 2007 album by New Years Day.

My Dear may also refer to:
 My Dear (British horse), British Thoroughbred racehorse
 My Dear III, American Thoroughbred racehorse
 "My Dear", a 2019 song by South Korean singer Chen from his EP Dear My Dear
 "My Dear", Russian song by Nikolai Ivanovich Kharito